El Paraíso is a town, with a population of 5,186 (2013 census), and a municipality in the Honduran department of Copán.

References 

Municipalities of the El Paraíso Department